This is a product list of items manufactured by Rickenbacker International Corporation, and predecessor companies, including musical instruments, amplifiers and accessories. The three Rickenbacker Vintage series (B - 1st, V - 2nd and C - 3rd) are listed in numerical order within the relevant product sections, not as a separate grouping, as are Specials and Limited Editions.

Ro-Pat-In Corporation

Hawaiian Electro Guitar
MODEL A "Frying Pan"
Model A-22 6 string
Model A-22 7 string
Model A-25 6 string
Model A-24 7 string

Electro String Instrument Corporation

Electro Series
MODEL ES
Model ES-16
Model ES-17

Rickenbacker Electro Hawaiian Guitar

MODEL 59
MODEL 100
MODEL 1002
MODEL "ACE" - student
MODEL B - Bakelite Steel Guitar
Model B-6
Model B-7
Model B-8
MODEL BD - Bakelite Steel Guitar Deluxe
Model BD-6
Model BD-7
Model BD-8
MODEL CW
Model CW-6
Model CW-7
Model CW-8
Model CW-10

MODEL D
Model D-12
Model D-14
Model D-16
Model DC-16
MODEL DW
Model DW-12
Model DW-16
MODEL ES
Model ES-16
Model ES-17
MODEL G
Model G-6
Model G-7
Model G-8
MODEL JB-10 "Jerry Bird"
MODEL NF
Model NF-6
Model NF-16

MODEL NS
Model NS-6
Model NS100-6
Model NS100-8
MODEL S
Model S
Model S59
Model S100
MODEL SD
Model SD-6
Model SD-7
Model SD-8
MODEL SW
Model SW-6
Model SW-8
MODEL TW

Console Series

Double-neck Range
Console 206
Console 208
Console 218

Triple-neck Range
Console 500
Console 508
Console 518

700 Series
Console 700
Console 706
Console 708
Console 718
Console 758
Console 768

Rickenbacker Electro Spanish Guitar
Spanish Guitar (standard)
Ken Roberts Model Spanish Guitar
Model SP
Model B Spanish Guitar
Vibrola Spanish Guitar

200 Series

Model 220 "Hamburg"
Model 230 "Hamburg"

Model 230 GF (Glenn Frey Limited Edition)
Model 230 GFLH

Model 2050 "El Dorado"
Model 2060 "El Dorado"

Rickenbacker 300 Series (Thin Body)

Standard 3/4 Range

Model 310
Model 315
Model 320
Model 320B
Model 320B LH
Model 320/12V63

Model 325 (RM 1996)
Model 325C58
Model 325C64
Model 325 JL (John Lennon Limited Edition)
Model 325 JLLH

Model 325V59
Model 325V59 "Hamburg"
Model 325V63
Model 325V63 "Miami"
Model 325/12
Model 325/12V63
Model 325/12 WRC

Standard Full Size Range

Model 330
Model 330/12
Model 330/12 Mid
Model 330S/12 (RM1997)
Model 331LS "Light Show"
Model 335
Model 336/12

Model 340
Model 341LS "Light Show"
Model 340S (RM1998)
Model 340/12
Model 345
Model 345S

Model 350 "Liverpool"
Model 350V63 "Liverpool"
Model 350/12V63 "Liverpool"
Model 350 SH (Susanna Hoffs Limited Edition)
Model 355 JL (John Lennon Limited Edition)
Model 355 JLLH
Model 355/12 JL
Model 355/12 JLLH

Deluxe Semi-Acoustic 3/4 Range

Model 360 (RM 1993)
Model 360B
Model 360B LH
Model 360CW (Carl Wilson Limited Edition)
Model 360 SPC RCA
Model 360 "Tuxedo"
Model 360V64
Model 360V64 LH

Model 360/12
Model 360/12B
Model 360/12C63
Model 360/12 CW (Carl Wilson Limited Edition)
Model 360/12 RCA
Model 360/12V64
Model 360/12V66

Model 362 - Double-neck
Model 365
Model 366
Model 370
Model 370/12
Model 370/12 LH
Model 370/12 RM (Roger McGuinn Limited Edition)
Model 370/12V67
Model 375

Deluxe Semi-Acoustic Full Body Range

Model 345F
Model 360F
Model 360F "Blue Boy" (x3)

Model 360/12F
Model 365F

Model 370F
Model 375F

Deep Body Acoustic Range

Model 380
Model 380L "Laguna"
Model 380L PZ

Model 381
Model 381JK (John Kay Limited Edition)
Model 381V69
Model 381/12
Model 381/12V69

Model 385
Model 385S
Model 386
Model 390
Model 391
Model 392

Combo 400 Series (Full Size Solid Body)

 Model 400 - student
Model 420
Model 425 (DUPA)
Model 425 - Student Model
Model 425V63

Model 430
Model 450
Model 450/12
Model 456/12
Model 460

Model 470
Model 480
Model 481 SF
Model 483
Model 490

Combo 600 Series (Solid Body)

Model 600
Model 610
Model 610/12
Model 615
Model 620
Model 620VB

Model 620/12
Model 625
Model 625/12 (one off for Mike Campbell)
Model 650
Model 650A/C/D/E/F/S

Model 660
Model 660/12
Model 660/12 TP (Tom Petty Limited Edition)

Acoustic 700 Series

Model 700C "Comstock"
Model 700S "Shasta"
Model 700C/12 "Comstock"

Model 700S "Shasta"
Model 730L "Laramie"
Model 730/12L "Laramie"

Model 730 Shiloh
Model 760J "Jazz-bo"

Combo 800 Series (Solid Body)
Model 800
Model 850

Combo 900 Series (3/4 Solid Body)

Model 900

Model 950

Model 1000

Rose Morris Series

Model 1993 (330/60-12 Export)
Model 1993V
Model 1993V/12

Model 1995 (615 Export)
Model 1996 (325 Export) "The Beatle Backer"
Model 1996V
Model 1997 (335 Export)
Model 1997V

Model 1997SPC VB
Model 1998 (345 Export)
Model 1998PT (Pete Townshend Limited Edition)

Rickenbacker Electro Bass Guitar
Tenor Guitar

Rose Morris Series
Model 1999 (4001 Export)

2000 Series

Model 2020 "Hamburg"
Model 2030 "Hamburg"

Model 2030 GF (Glenn Frey Signature)
Model 2030 Mid

Model 2050 "El Dorado"
Model 2060 "El Dorado"

3000 Series
Model 3000
Model 3001

4000 Series
Model 4000
Model 4000 FL

4001 Range

Model 4001
Model 4001C64
Model 4001C64S
Model 4001 CS (Chris Squire Limited Edition)

Model 4001 FL
Model 4001 LH
Model 4001S
Model 4001S FL
Model 4001S PMC (Paul McCartney Limited Edition)

Model 4001V63
Model 4001V63 MG
Model 4001V63 PMC
Model 4001-5

4002 Range
Model 4002 - Studio

4003 Range

Model 4003
Model 4003AC (Al Cisneros Limited Edition)
Model 4003 FL
Model 4003 LH
Model 4003 "Shadow"
Model 4003 SPC "Redneck"

Model 4003 SPC-8 "Redneck"
Model 4003 SPC "Tuxedo"
Model 4003S
Model 4003SB
Model 4003SB LH

Model 4003S LH
Model 4003S SPC "Blackstar"
Model 4003VPCB
Model 4003S/5
Model 4003S/8
• Model 4003w

• Model 4003sw

4004 Range

Model 4004Ci "Cheyenne"
Model 4004Cii "Cheyenne"

Model 4004Cii-5 "Cheyenne"
Model 4004L (Laredo)

Model 4004 LK (Lemmy Kilmister Limited Edition)

4005 Range

Model 4005
Model 4005/5

Model 4005/6
Model 4005/8

Model 4005 LS "Lightshow"

Higher Range

Model 4008 - 8 string
Model 4080 - Double-neck (4 + 6 string)

Model 4080/12 - Double-neck (4 + 12 string)
Model 4080/12/6 - Triple-neck (4 + 6 + 12 string)

Rickenbacker Electro Mandolin

Model Mando Guitar

Model 5000 (4 string)
Model 5001 (5 string)

Model 5002 (8 string)
Model 5002V58 Mandolin

Rickenbacker Electro Banjo

Model 6000 Bantar

Model 6005 Banjoline

Model 6006 Banjoline Deluxe

Other Instruments
Harpo Marx (Electric Harp)
Electro Violin

Amplifiers

B Series

B-9A
B-14A

B-15A
B-16 Head
B-16 Combo

B-22
B-410

R35B

M Series

Model M-8
Model M-8E
Model M-9
Model M-10
Model M-11
Model M-11A

Model M-12
Model M-12A
Model M-14A
Model M-15
Model M-15A
Model M-16

Model M-22
Model M-23
Model M-30
Model M-88
Model M-98

R Series

R7
R14
R35B

R220
RG30
RG16T

RB30
RB120

TR Series

TR7
TR 14

TR25
TR35B

TR50

Others

Cut Out 1943
Ek-O-Tone reverb
Lunchbox 1934

Model 59
Ninety-eight High Fidelity Amplifier

PA-38
PA-120

Extension Speakers

E-12

E-15

The Speaker

Accessories

Cases
No. 700
No. 21-D-1
C300 (3/4 /D/S)
C400
C430
C600 (D/S)

Microphones
664 Microphone

Pedals
No. 300 - Pedal Volume Control for Hawaiian and Spanish guitars

Pics
Pics 14-C
Speed pics 61-C

Stands
MS-10c
MS-11C

Others
Pick Display Cabinets, Hawaiian Guitar Stand, Electro Strings, Slides, Amplifier Covers, Amplifier Legs, Guitar Legs, Amplifier Tube kits, Dust Cloth, Phantasmagorion,

Colors and Body Finish
'Fireglo' (a shaded red), the company's longest running color option, has been made available every year since 1958, with 'Jetglo' (black) and 'Mapleglo' (natural) right behind, being made available every year since 1959. The colors' names usually have official abbreviations (such as 'JG' for 'Jetglo').

Current Available Colors 

 Fireglo (FG) - a sunburst color; deep dark red that fades into a lighter maple center
 Jetglo (JG) - black
 Mapleglo (MG) - Natural
 Walnut (W) - Walnut unlacquered body with natural unpolished maple neck and fretboard. Introduced 2014 (not the same as WAL).
 Matte Black (MBL)
 Matte Autumnglo (MAG) - a matte sunburst color; deep brown that fades into a yellow center

Non-standard, only available for 650 series:
 Walnut Oil Finish (WAL)

Non-standard, 480/481/483 Series:
Among the 'special' colors available for the 480 series guitars, AutumnGlo (AUTUM) and Walnut (WAL) are often mistaken as being the same. AutumnGlo on the 480 series represented a flat matte finish, where Walnut designated the same color and burst, but in a traditional lacquered finish.

Formerly available colors 

 Blonde (1954 - 1957)
 Brown (1954 - 1957)
 Green (1954 - 1957)
 Turquoise Blue (1954 - 1957)
 Jet Black (1954 - 1957)
 Autumnglo (1957 - 1983)
 Natural (1957 - 1960)
 White (1957, 1969 - 1999)
 Burgundyglo (1963 - 1983)
 Azureglo (1969 - 1984)
 Ruby Red (1978 - 1984, 2012 - 2017)
 Silver (1978 - 1984)
 Red (1984 - 1997)
 Turquoise (1989 - 2002)
 Midnight Blue (1986 - 2019, mid-1960s 360/6's)

Colors of the Year: 2000-2006
Rickenbacker produced a 'color of the year' for most of their models from 2000 to 2006.

 2000: Sea Green
 2001: Desert Gold
 2002: Burgundy
 2003 - 2004: Montezuma Brown
 2004: Blue Boy
 2005: Blue Burst
 2006: Amber Fireglo

References

Rickenbacker products